Spassky (masculine), Spasskaya (feminine), or Spasskoye (neuter) is the name of several  rural localities in Russia.

Republic of Bashkortostan
As of 2010, two rural localities in the Republic of Bashkortostan bear this name:
Spasskoye, Iglinsky District, Republic of Bashkortostan, a village in Tavtimanovsky Selsoviet of Iglinsky District
Spasskoye, Sterlitamaksky District, Republic of Bashkortostan, a village in Podlesnensky Selsoviet of Sterlitamaksky District

Bryansk Oblast
As of 2010, one rural locality in Bryansk Oblast bears this name:
Spassky, Bryansk Oblast, a settlement in Baklansky Selsoviet of Pochepsky District

Chelyabinsk Oblast
As of 2010, one rural locality in Chelyabinsk Oblast bears this name:
Spassky, Chelyabinsk Oblast, a settlement in Spassky Selsoviet of Verkhneuralsky District

Ivanovo Oblast
As of 2010, three rural localities in Ivanovo Oblast bear this name:
Spasskoye, Komsomolsky District, Ivanovo Oblast, a village in Komsomolsky District
Spasskoye, Privolzhsky District, Ivanovo Oblast, a village in Privolzhsky District
Spasskoye, Yuzhsky District, Ivanovo Oblast, a village in Yuzhsky District

Kaluga Oblast
As of 2010, one rural locality in Kaluga Oblast bears this name:
Spasskoye, Kaluga Oblast, a village in Baryatinsky District

Kirov Oblast
As of 2010, five rural localities in Kirov Oblast bear this name:
Spasskoye, Bogorodsky District, Kirov Oblast, a selo in Spassky Rural Okrug of Bogorodsky District
Spasskoye, Kotelnichsky District, Kirov Oblast, a selo in Spassky Rural Okrug of Kotelnichsky District
Spasskoye, Slobodskoy District, Kirov Oblast, a village in Zakarinsky Rural Okrug of Slobodskoy District
Spasskaya, Kumyonsky District, Kirov Oblast, a village under the administrative jurisdiction of the urban-type settlement of Kumyony, Kumyonsky District
Spasskaya, Sunsky District, Kirov Oblast, a village in Bolshevistsky Rural Okrug of Sunsky District

Kostroma Oblast
As of 2010, one rural locality in Kostroma Oblast bears this name:
Spasskoye, Kostroma Oblast, a village in Sudislavskoye Settlement of Sudislavsky District

Kurgan Oblast
As of 2010, one rural locality in Kurgan Oblast bears this name:
Spasskoye, Kurgan Oblast, a village in Samokhvalovsky Selsoviet of Shatrovsky District

Kursk Oblast
As of 2010, two rural localities in Kursk Oblast bear this name:
Spasskoye, Kursk Oblast, a village in Spassky Selsoviet of Medvensky District
Spasskaya, Kursk Oblast, a village in Volokonsky Selsoviet of Bolshesoldatsky District

Lipetsk Oblast
As of 2010, three rural localities in Lipetsk Oblast bear this name:
Spasskoye, Stanovlyansky District, Lipetsk Oblast, a selo in Lamskoy Selsoviet of Stanovlyansky District
Spasskoye, Volovsky District, Lipetsk Oblast, a selo in Spassky Selsoviet of Volovsky District
Spasskaya, Lipetsk Oblast, a village in Tulsky Selsoviet of Terbunsky District

Mari El Republic
As of 2010, one rural locality in the Mari El Republic bears this name:
Spassky, Mari El Republic, a village in Mikhaylovsky Rural Okrug of Sovetsky District

Republic of Mordovia
As of 2010, two rural localities in the Republic of Mordovia bear this name:
Spasskoye, Bolsheignatovsky District, Republic of Mordovia, a selo in Spassky Selsoviet of Bolsheignatovsky District
Spasskoye, Ruzayevsky District, Republic of Mordovia, a selo in Russko-Baymakovsky Selsoviet of Ruzayevsky District

Moscow Oblast
As of 2010, four rural localities in Moscow Oblast bear this name:
Spasskoye, Klinsky District, Moscow Oblast, a village in Petrovskoye Rural Settlement of Klinsky District
Spasskoye, Leninsky District, Moscow Oblast, a village under the administrative jurisdiction of the town of Vidnoye, Leninsky District
Spasskoye, Odintsovsky District, Moscow Oblast, a village in Yershovskoye Rural Settlement of Odintsovsky District
Spasskoye, Stupinsky District, Moscow Oblast, a selo in Leontyevskoye Rural Settlement of Stupinsky District

Nizhny Novgorod Oblast
As of 2010, four rural localities in Nizhny Novgorod Oblast bear this name:
Spasskoye, Bor, Nizhny Novgorod Oblast, a selo in Lindovsky Selsoviet of under the administrative jurisdiction of the town of Bor
Spasskoye, Shatkovsky District, Nizhny Novgorod Oblast, a selo in Kerzhemoksky Selsoviet of Shatkovsky District
Spasskoye, Spassky District, Nizhny Novgorod Oblast, a selo in Spassky Selsoviet of Spassky District
Spasskoye, Vetluzhsky District, Nizhny Novgorod Oblast, a selo in Makaryevsky Selsoviet of Vetluzhsky District

Novgorod Oblast
As of 2010, one rural locality in Novgorod Oblast bears this name:
Spasskoye, Novgorod Oblast, a village in Progresskoye Settlement of Borovichsky District

Omsk Oblast
As of 2010, one rural locality in Omsk Oblast bears this name:
Spasskoye, Omsk Oblast, a selo in Krasnopolyansky Rural Okrug of Gorkovsky District

Orenburg Oblast
As of 2010, two rural localities in Orenburg Oblast bear this name:
Spasskoye, Saraktashsky District, Orenburg Oblast, a selo in Spassky Selsoviet of Saraktashsky District
Spasskoye, Sorochinsky District, Orenburg Oblast, a selo in Voykovsky Selsoviet of Sorochinsky District

Oryol Oblast
As of 2010, six rural localities in Oryol Oblast bear this name:
Spassky, Oryol Oblast, a settlement in Berezovsky Selsoviet of Dmitrovsky District
Spasskoye, Korsakovsky District, Oryol Oblast, a selo in Nechayevsky Selsoviet of Korsakovsky District
Spasskoye, Mtsensky District, Oryol Oblast, a selo in Protasovsky Selsoviet of Mtsensky District
Spasskoye, Saburovsky Selsoviet, Orlovsky District, Oryol Oblast, a selo in Saburovsky Selsoviet of Orlovsky District
Spasskoye, Spassky Selsoviet, Orlovsky District, Oryol Oblast, a selo in Spassky Selsoviet of Orlovsky District
Spasskoye, Sverdlovsky District, Oryol Oblast, a village in Bogodukhovsky Selsoviet of Sverdlovsky District

Primorsky Krai
As of 2010, one rural locality in Primorsky Krai bears this name:
Spasskoye, Primorsky Krai, a selo in Spassky District

Pskov Oblast
As of 2010, one rural locality in Pskov Oblast bears this name:
Spasskoye, Pskov Oblast, a village in Pskovsky District

Ryazan Oblast
As of 2010, one rural locality in Ryazan Oblast bears this name:
Spasskoye, Ryazan Oblast, a selo in Spassky Rural Okrug of Miloslavsky District

Samara Oblast
As of 2010, two rural localities in Samara Oblast bear this name:
Spasskoye, Privolzhsky District, Samara Oblast, a selo in Privolzhsky District
Spasskoye, Sergiyevsky District, Samara Oblast, a selo in Sergiyevsky District

Saratov Oblast
As of 2010, one rural locality in Saratov Oblast bears this name:
Spasskoye, Saratov Oblast, a selo in Volsky District

Smolensk Oblast
As of 2010, one rural locality in Smolensk Oblast bears this name:
Spasskoye, Smolensk Oblast, a village in Medvedevskoye Rural Settlement of Tyomkinsky District

Stavropol Krai
As of 2010, one rural locality in Stavropol Krai bears this name:
Spasskoye, Stavropol Krai, a selo in Blagodarnensky District

Tambov Oblast
As of 2010, one rural locality in Tambov Oblast bears this name:
Spasskoye, Tambov Oblast, a selo in Spassky Selsoviet of Staroyuryevsky District

Republic of Tatarstan
As of 2010, one rural locality in the Republic of Tatarstan bears this name:
Spasskoye, Republic of Tatarstan, a selo in Bugulminsky District

Tver Oblast
As of 2010, three rural localities in Tver Oblast bear this name:
Spasskoye, Kalyazinsky District, Tver Oblast, a selo in Kalyazinsky District
Spasskoye, Kashinsky District, Tver Oblast, a selo in Kashinsky District
Spasskoye, Staritsky District, Tver Oblast, a village in Staritsky District

Vladimir Oblast
As of 2010, four rural localities in Vladimir Oblast bear this name:
Spasskoye, Vladimir, Vladimir Oblast, a selo under the administrative jurisdiction of the city of  Vladimir
Spasskoye (selo), Sobinsky District, Vladimir Oblast, a selo in Sobinsky District
Spasskoye (village), Sobinsky District, Vladimir Oblast, a village in Sobinsky District
Spasskoye, Yuryev-Polsky District, Vladimir Oblast, a selo in Yuryev-Polsky District

Vologda Oblast
As of 2010, nine rural localities in Vologda Oblast bear this name:
Spasskoye, Gryazovetsky District, Vologda Oblast, a village in Lezhsky Selsoviet of Gryazovetsky District
Spasskoye, Kharovsky District, Vologda Oblast, a selo in Kharovsky Selsoviet of Kharovsky District
Spasskoye, Biryakovsky Selsoviet, Sokolsky District, Vologda Oblast, a village in Biryakovsky Selsoviet of Sokolsky District
Spasskoye, Prigorodny Selsoviet, Sokolsky District, Vologda Oblast, a village in Prigorodny Selsoviet of Sokolsky District
Spasskoye, Syamzhensky District, Vologda Oblast, a village in Filinsky Selsoviet of Syamzhensky District
Spasskoye, Ust-Kubinsky District, Vologda Oblast, a village in Mitensky Selsoviet of Ust-Kubinsky District
Spasskoye, Ustyuzhensky District, Vologda Oblast, a settlement in Podolsky Selsoviet of Ustyuzhensky District
Spasskoye, Vologodsky District, Vologda Oblast, a selo in Spassky Selsoviet of Vologodsky District
Spasskaya, Vologda Oblast, a village in Ilyinsky Selsoviet of Kharovsky District

Voronezh Oblast
As of 2010, two rural localities in Voronezh Oblast bear this name:
Spasskoye, Semiluksky District, Voronezh Oblast, a village in Zemlyanskoye Rural Settlement of Semiluksky District
Spasskoye, Verkhnekhavsky District, Voronezh Oblast, a selo in Spasskoye Rural Settlement of Verkhnekhavsky District

Yaroslavl Oblast
As of 2010, four rural localities in Yaroslavl Oblast bear this name:
Spasskoye, Nekouzsky District, Yaroslavl Oblast, a village in Rodionovsky Rural Okrug of Nekouzsky District
Spasskoye, Klementyevsky Rural Okrug, Uglichsky District, Yaroslavl Oblast, a village in Klementyevsky Rural Okrug of Uglichsky District
Spasskoye, Otradnovsky Rural Okrug, Uglichsky District, Yaroslavl Oblast, a selo in Otradnovsky Rural Okrug of Uglichsky District
Spasskoye, Yaroslavsky District, Yaroslavl Oblast, a selo in Bekrenevsky Rural Okrug of Yaroslavsky District

See also
Spassk, several inhabited localities in Russia
Novospassky (inhabited locality), several inhabited localities in Russia